The 1946 Colorado gubernatorial election was held on November 5, 1946. Democratic nominee William Lee Knous defeated Republican nominee Leon Lavington with 52.11% of the vote, becoming the first Democrat to win the governorship since 1936.

Primary elections
Primary elections were held on September 10, 1946.

Democratic primary

Candidates
William Lee Knous, Chief Justice of the Colorado Supreme Court

Results

Republican primary

Candidates
Leon Lavington, Auditor of Colorado

Results

General election

Candidates
William Lee Knous, Democratic
Leon Lavington, Republican

Results

References

1946
Colorado
Gubernatorial